Magnus Grankvist (born 3 April 1964) is a Swedish professional golfer and golf coach. He won the 1986 Europcar Cup, a "special event" on the European Tour, and the 1989 SM Match on the Challenge Tour.

Career
Grankvist was part of the National Team as an amateur. He won the bronze at the 1984 European Youths' Team Championship at Hermitage GC, Ireland with a team that included Jesper Parnevik, Fredrik Lindgren and Johan Ryström. After turning professional, he played on the Swedish Golf Tour, where he won four tournaments, including the SM Match in 1986 and 1989. In 1989, the tournament was part of the Satellite Tour, which soon was renamed the Challenge Tour. In 1986, he finished third on the Swedish Golf Tour Order of Merit, behind Per-Arne Brostedt and Magnus Persson Atlevi.

In 1986, he was part of the winning Swedish team at the Europcar Cup together with Anders Forsbrand, Per-Arne Brostedt and Magnus Sunesson.

Coaching career
Grankvist started working for the Swedish Golf Federation after retiring from tour. 1998–2002 he was head coach for the National Boys Team, which he led to victory at the 2001 European Boys' Team Championship at Amber Baltic GC in Poland and silver the following year at Reykjavik GC in Iceland. Both teams included Jonas Blixt, Steven Jeppesen and Niklas Lemke.

In 2003 he coached the Swedish team to a bronze finish behind Spain and England at the European Amateur Team Championship held at Royal Hague GCC, Netherlands. The team consisted of Kalle Edberg, Steven Jeppesen, Niklas Lemke, Per Nilsson, Alex Norén and Wilhelm Schauman.
 
He also coached the European team in the 2005 Palmer Cup, a match the Americans won 14 to 10.

Professional wins (7)

Swedish Golf Tour wins (4)

Sources:

Other wins (3)
2011 (2) Forsgården Open, DM Herrar Göteborg
2012 (1) Sportlife Open

Team appearances
Amateur
European Youths' Team Championship (representing Sweden): 1984

Professional
Europcar Cup (representing Sweden): 1986 (winners)
Source:

References

External links

Swedish male golfers
Golfers from Stockholm
1964 births
Living people